This is the list of notable footballers  who have played for Real Betis Balompié. Generally, this means players that have played 100 or more first division matches for the club. However, some players who have played fewer matches are also included; this includes the club's founder members, first nationals at the club, and some players who fell short of the 100 total but made significant contributions to the club's history e.g. players who have set a club record such as the youngest player to score, top goalscorer in a season, first La Liga goal ever, etcetera.

Players are listed by nationality and then by beginning of career. Appearances are for first division matches only. Substitute appearances included. Statistics correct as of July 20, 2007.

Notable players

An asterisk (*) next to a name denotes that the player had more than one spell at the club.

Real Betis Balompie players

Players
Association football player non-biographical articles